Marc Breuers (born 10 April 1975 in New York City) is a former Barber Dodge Pro Series and Atlantic Championship driver.

Racing career
Breuers started his first competitive racing championship in 1999. Breuers won nine races in his inaugural season. Breuers finished second in the championship, three points behind Ryan Hunter-Reay.

The young driver struggled in his first season in the Barber Dodge Pro Series. In 2000 his best results were two ninth place finishes at Lime Rock Park and Vancouver. For 2001 Breuers returned to the series. The American captured his first podium finish. At Cleveland Breuers finished behind Sepp Koster and Matt Plumb. With consistent top ten finishes Breuers finished sixth in the standings. Breuers's third, and final, year in the Barber Dodge Pro Series proved to be his best season. With four podium finishes, including a win at Mid-Ohio, Breuers finished third in the standings.

After his strong performance in the Barber Dodge Pro Series Breuers moved up the ladder into the Atlantic Championship. However due to limited sponsorship he only raced three races. But after failing to achieve major results and failing to gain sponsorship Breuers retired from professional auto racing after the 2003 season.

Complete motorsports results

American Open-Wheel racing results
(key) (Races in bold indicate pole position, races in italics indicate fastest race lap)

Barber Dodge Pro Series

Atlantic Championship

References

External links
 Official website

1975 births
Living people
Racing drivers from New York City
Barber Pro Series drivers
Atlantic Championship drivers